The Memorial Pillar located in Valivade (a village near Kolhapur, India) is in memory of over 5000 Polish refugees who escaped to India during World War II and were given shelter in the area. Poland''s Deputy Foreign Minister Marcin Przydacz unveiled the pillar on 14 September 2019.

Background 
The first group of refugees had arrived in Valivade on 11 June 1943 and stayed till 1948. Whereas in 1948, many Poles returned to their homeland, a few stayed back. Valivade was the largest settlement of Polish citizens In India during the war. 
There were other smaller Polish settlements in India at the time in areas such as Balachadi and Panchgani which offered settlement mainly due to the hospitality of Digvijaysinhji Ranjitsinhji, Maharaja Jam Sahib of Nawanagar State. A Polish cemetery is also in Vilavade, home to 78 people who died there.

See also 
 India–Poland relations

References

Further reading 
 Kresy Siberia Virtual Museum – Polish refugees in Valivade, everyday life in photographs

Poland in World War II
India in World War II
Monuments and memorials in India